Polish Sign Language ("Polski Język Migowy", PJM) is the language of the deaf community in Poland. Polish Sign Language uses a distinctive one-handed manual alphabet based on the alphabet used in Old French Sign Language and therefore appears to be related to French Sign Language. It may also have common features with Russian Sign Language and German Sign Language, which is related to the history of Poland during the Partitions, when Russification and Germanization significantly influenced the Polish language, and may also have borrowings from the sign language used in the Austrian partition. Its lexicon and grammar are distinct from the Polish language, although there is a manually coded version of Polish known as System Językowo-Migowy (SJM, or Signed Polish), which is often used by interpreters on television and by teachers in schools.

Polish Sign Language was first formed/became prevalent around 1817. Around that time, the Instytut Głuchoniemych (Institute for the Deaf-Mute) was founded by Jakub Falkowski, who began teaching deaf children after meeting a deaf boy by the name of Piotr Gąsowski. In 1879, its first dictionary was published by Józef Hollak and Teofil Jagodziński, titled "Słownik mimiczny dla głuchoniemych i osób z nimi styczność mających" ("The Mimic Dictionary for the Deaf-Mute and Persons Having Contact with Them").

In 2012, under the "Sign Language Act", the language received official status in Poland and can be chosen as the language of instruction by those who require it.

References

Scholarly literature
Piotr Fabian and Jarosław Francik. "Synthesis and presentation of the Polish sign language gestures." 1st International Conf. on Applied Mathematics and Informatics at Universities. 2001.
Farris, M. A. Sign language research and Polish sign language. Lingua Posnaniensis 36 (1994): 13–36. 
Mariusz Oszust and Marian Wysocki. Polish sign language words recognition with Kinect. Human System Interaction (HSI), 2013 The 6th International Conference on. IEEE, 2013.

External links
  Polish manual alphabet
(image here)
 Polish Association of the Deaf official website
  History of Polish Sign Language

Languages of Poland
Sign languages